Dexion Absolute Limited is a Guernsey-registered, closed-ended investment company listed on the London Stock Exchange. Established in December 2002, the company was formerly a constituent of the FTSE 250 Index. The chairman is John Hallam.

Investment objective
The company's investment objective is to generate consistent long-term capital appreciation with low volatility and little correlation with the general equity and bond markets through a portfolio having a diversified risk profile. The Company seeks to achieve this through investment in an actively managed portfolio of hedge funds diversified by investment strategy, style and manager.

Key facts
 Manager: Dexion Capital (Guernsey) Limited
 Investment adviser: Aurora Investment Management L.L.C.
 Investment consultant: Dexion Capital plc

References

  Official site

Financial services companies established in 2002
2002 establishments in Guernsey